Rezgah or Rez Gah or Razgeh may refer to:
Razgeh, Chaharmahal and Bakhtiari
Rez Gah, Khuzestan
Rezgah, Lorestan
Razgeh, West Azerbaijan

See also
Razgah (disambiguation)